Gnathothlibus heliodes is a moth of the  family Sphingidae. It is known from Papua New Guinea and some adjacent islands.

The outer margin of the forewing is straight or very slightly convex. The forewing upperside ground colour is light brown with a straight brown postmedian line, two slightly convex basal lines and two indistinct crenulated antemedian lines.

References

Gnathothlibus
Moths described in 1898